The 23rd World Cup season began in November 1988 in Austria and concluded in March 1989 in Japan. 
The overall champions were Marc Girardelli of Luxembourg (his third) and Vreni Schneider of Switzerland (her first).  Schneider established the record for victories in a World Cup season, winning a total of 14 races (6 (out of 7) giant slaloms, 7 (out of 7) slaloms, and 1 (of 2) combined), surpassing the record of 13 established in 1978-79 by the great Swedish skier and three-time overall World Cup champion Ingemar Stenmark.

Stenmark, who became the primary example of the transition of the World Cup circuit from fully amateur to fully professional during his 16-year career, retired at the end of the season, after notching his all-time record 86th race victory in February.  All of Stenmark's victories were either in giant slalom (46) or slalom (40).

The break in the schedule in early February was for the 1989 World Championships, held in Vail, Colorado, USA.

Calendar

Men

Ladies

Men

Overall 

see complete table

In Men's Overall World Cup 1988/89 all results count. The parallel slalom did not count for the Overall World Cup. Marc Girardelli won his third Overall World Cup.

Downhill 

see complete table

In Men's Downhill World Cup 1988/89 all results count.

Super G 

see complete table

In Men's Super G World Cup 1988/89 all four results count. Pirmin Zurbriggen won his third Super G World Cup in a row. All events were won by a different racer.

Giant Slalom 

see complete table

In Men's Giant Slalom World Cup 1988/89 all results count. Ole Kristian Furuseth won Giant Slalom World Cup (20 points two times).

Slalom 

see complete table

In Men's Slalom World Cup 1988/89 all results count.

Combined 

see complete table

In Men's Combined World Cup 1988/89 all three results count.

Ladies

Overall 

see complete table

In Women's Overall World Cup 1988/89 all results count. The parallel slalom did not count for the Overall World Cup.

Downhill 

see complete table

In Women's Downhill World Cup 1988/89 all results count. Michela Figini won her fourth Downhill World Cup (the last three in a row). She was able to win six races and only her teammate Maria Walliser was able to take two wins. The second consecutive season that saw only wins by Swiss athletes!

Super G 

see complete table

In Women's Super G World Cup 1988/89 all four results count.

Giant Slalom 

see complete table

In Women's Giant Slalom World Cup 1988/89 all results count. Vreni Schneider won her third Giant Slalom World Cup by winning 6 races out of 7. Only her teammate Maria Walliser was able to win a single race.

Slalom 

see complete table

In Women's Slalom World Cup 1988/89 all results count. Vreni Schneider won all races and won the cup with maximum points. Up to now this was the last time an athlete was able to win a cup with maximum points. Together with the win in the first race next season 1989/90 Vreni Schneider was able to win nine world cup slalom races in a row!

Combined 

see complete table

In Women's Combined World Cup 1988/89 both results count. Brigitte Oertli won her fourth Combined World Cup (the last three in a row).

Nations Cup

Overall

Men 

All points were shown. But without parallel slalom, because result ? (Also possible, that the parallel slaloms were only show-events.)

Ladies 

All points were shown. But without parallel slalom, because result ? (Also possible, that the parallel slaloms were only show-events.) Only three teams were able to win races.

References

External links
FIS-ski.com - World Cup standings - 1989

FIS Alpine Ski World Cup
World Cup
World Cup